Iaudas or Iabdas was a Berber leader of the sixth century and king of the Kingdom of the Aurès who held the Byzantines in check for a long time in the Aurès, and played an important role in the Berber revolts following the Byzantine reconquest.

Biography
Iaudas was the son-in-law of Méphanias, another tribal chief, whom he assassinated, and the brother-in-law of Massônas, son of Méphanias. According to Corippus, he was the dux of the Aurasitana manus, i.e. the leader of the Auresian army, and according to Procopius, the leader of the Berbers of Aurasion. The latter also describes him as being “of all the Moors the handsomest and most valiant”.

At the beginning of 535, while the Byzantine general Solomon was busy dealing with the revolt of the Berbers of Byzacena, led by the chiefs Cutzinas, Esdilasas, Medisinissas and Iourphouthès, Iaudas took the opportunity to take his 30,000 warriors to invade and plunder the countryside of Numidia, as far as the region of Tigisis (present-day Aïn el-Bordj, in Algeria), taking a large number of prisoners. Procopius relates that the officer Althias, placed in the city of Centuria, in charge of guarding the forts of this canton, and his small federated army of 70 cavalrymen, met Iaudas soon after, near the water source of Tigisis; Iaudas wanted to have access to water from the fountain for his men "devoured by the ardent thirst produced by fatigue and the heat, because it was then at the height of summer", while Althias wanted to recover some prisoners from Iaudas. In order to settle the dispute, the two leaders fought face to face in single combat. Iaudas, terrified by the dexterity of Althias, who killed his horse, fled with his army in disorder. All loot and prisoners were collected by the Byzantines.

In 534-535, the Berbers of Byzacena, insurgents against the new power, were defeated by Solomon during the battles of Mammes and Mount Bourgaon, which placed Iaudas in the front line against the Empire. He stood up, first welcoming the survivors of the insurrection, like Cutzinas, then resisting Solomon's advance in the Aurès.

Solomon, with two Berber chiefs, Masuna, who sought revenge for his father, assassinated by Iaudas, and Orthaïas, victim of a conspiracy by Iaudas and Mastigas, advanced against the Aurès. He challenged Iaudas to battle, but after three days his soldiers grew suspicious of the loyalty of the Berbers. As a result, Solomon abandoned the campaign and did not engage in conflict with them again until 537 due to a mutiny by the Byzantine army in the spring of 536.

Iaudas reappears in the sources in 537 when he joined Stotzas, the leader of a major Byzantine army mutiny, and reconciled with one of his old rivals, Orthaïas, who commanded Berber tribes located west of the Aurès. In the Battle of Scalas Veteres, Iaudas and the other Berber chieftains accompanying Stotzas fell back and Stotzas was defeated. In 539, Solomon had a second and meticulous campaign in the heart of the Aurès, this time decisive: Iaudas was hunted down, and had to give in after a long resistance. He lost his treasure, his wives (or his concubines), and was wounded in the thigh by a javelin, but did not capitulate: he chose exile in Mauretania, perhaps with his old ally, Mastigas.

The great revolt of the tribes of Tripolitania and Byzacena, 5 years later, however, enabled him to achieve a spectacular recovery. In 544, Solomon and his troops were crushed at the Battle of Sufetula by the Berber leader Antalas, the Byzantine general was himself killed.

At the end of 545, he emerged again to attack the Empire at the head of an army from Numidia, which he joined with the great coalition of insurgents led by Antalas and the Laguatan, and participated with them, in 546, in the negotiations with another Byzantine dissenter, the usurper of Vandal origin Guntarith, and then in the war waged against the new general sent by Justinian, replacing Solomon, John Troglita. In coalition with Guntharic, he and Cutzinas headed for Carthage, while the Berber leader Antalas pounded and invaded Byzacena. Carthage was taken, however, Guntharic was the victim of a conspiracy and was assassinated by Artabanes shortly after; the city was taken over by the Byzantines.

In the summer of 546, Iaudas was definitively defeated by the Byzantine general John Troglita, he was not forced to flee this time, but had to accept the tutelage of the Byzantines. Indeed, he reappears in the sources only in 547/548 and 548, to provide soldiers at the call of John Troglita, and to follow their army when it has to fight against a new attack from the tribes of Tripolitania. He participated in the victorious battle of the Fields of Cato against Antalas and Carcasan and would have provided a contingent of 12,000 men according to Corippus, who presents him as the famulatus Iaudas, the only one who, in the descriptions of the Berber auxiliaries in the Johannide, appears as an ally in spite of himself, who acts under duress.

References

Sources 

 
 
 
 
 
 
 
 
 
 
 
 

5th-century Berber people
5th-century monarchs in Africa
Berber rulers